McGinnis Creek may refer to several creeks in the United States of America:

 Little McGinnis Creek, Rosebud County, Montana
 McGinnis Creek (Alaska)
 McGinnis Creek (Humboldt County), California
 McGinnis Creek (San Luis Obispo County), California
 McGinnis Creek (Idaho)
 McGinnis Creek (Flathead County), Montana
 McGinnis Creek (Lincoln County), Montana
 McGinnis Creek (Missoula County), Montana
 McGinnis Creek (Rosebud County), Montana
 McGinnis Creek (Sanders County), Montana
 McGinnis Creek (Crook County), Oregon
 McGinnis Creek (Douglas County), Oregon
 McGinnis Creek (Wheeler County), Oregon
 McGinnis Creek (Washington)
 McGinnis Creek (Wisconsin)